Ivano Ciano (born 3 May 1983 in San Giovanni Rotondo, Foggia, Italy) is an Italian footballer. He plays as a defender. He is currently playing for Italian Lega Pro Seconda Divisione team Catanzaro.

External links
Career statistics 

Italian footballers
Vastese Calcio 1902 players
U.S. Catanzaro 1929 players
Living people
1983 births
Association football defenders